Moroni is a given name and a surname which may refer to:

Given name 

Moroni Olsen (1889–1954), American actor
Moroni Bing Torgan (born 1956), Brazilian politician
Prophet Moroni, a prophet in the Book of Mormon
Mack Swain (1876–1935), silent film actor, born Moroni Swain

Surname 

Agueda Moroni (born 1997), Argentinian born, Italian field hockey player
Alice Moroni (born 1991), Italian former professional tennis player
Andrea Moroni (born 1985), footballer from San Marino
Angel Moroni, the angel that Joseph Smith said visited him
Anna Moroni (educator) (1613–1675), Italian educator
Chiara Moroni (born 1974), Italian politician
Claudia Moroni (born 1944), birth name of Claudia Mori, Italian actress, singer, and television producer
Claudio Moroni (1959), Argentine lawyer and politician
Dado Moroni (born 1962), Italian jazz pianist and composer
David Lee Moroni (born 1938), Canadian former ballet dancer and teacher
Edoardo Moroni (1902–1975), Italian Fascist politician
Ezio Moroni (born 1961), Italian former professional road cyclist
Gian Marco Moroni (born 1998), Italian professional tennis player
Giovanni Morone or Moroni (1509–1580), Italian cardinal and bishop
Giovanni Battista Moroni (1520–1578), Italian painter of the late renaissance
Gaetano Moroni (1802–1883), Italian writer and official in the papal court who wrote the Dizionario di erudizione storico-ecclesiastica
Maria Costanza Moroni (born 1969), former Italian high jumper, long jumper and triple jumper
Matías Moroni (born 1991), Argentine rugby union player
Paulo Ricardo Moroni (born 1961), Brazilian retired footballer known as Moroni

See also

Mount Moroni
Moroni (disambiguation)
House of Moroni (or Morone), a noble family in Italy
Morony

Italian-language surnames